Marginella amazona is a species of sea snail, a marine gastropod mollusk in the family Marginellidae, the margin snails.

Description

Distribution
This species occurs in the Atlantic Ocean off Benin.

References

 Cossignani T. (2006). Marginellidae & Cystiscidae of the World. L'Informatore Piceno. 408pp

External links
 Dautzenberg P. (1912) Mission Gruvel sur la côte occidentale d'Afrique (1909–1910): Mollusques marins. Annales de l'Institut Océanographique, Paris, (Nouvelle Série) 5(3): 1–111, pl. 1-3.

amazona
Gastropods described in 1912